The Eternity Trap is a two-part story of The Sarah Jane Adventures which was first broadcast on CBBC on 5 and 6 November 2009. It is the fourth serial of the third series. The story involves the scientific investigation of a haunted house.

Plot
In the 17th century, Lord Marchwood employed Erasmus Darkening, an alien trapped on Earth, to make gold out of base metals. Erasmus was secretly working on a transdimensional accelerator to create a portal to his own galaxy. While Marchwood's children spied on Erasmus, he used the accelerator to trap them between dimensions. Lord Marchwood confronted Erasmus and attacked the machine, causing it to malfunction. To maintain immortality, Erasmus used the energy from people he has trapped over the centuries with his technology.

In the present, Professor Rivers and her assistant Toby perform a scientific investigation of ghost sightings at Lord Marchwood's manor. They are joined by Sarah Jane, Clyde, and Rani. A mysterious poltergeist-like entity begins manipulating objects, including writing the message "get out" on a mirror; this is Lord Marchwood trying to scare everyone off to avoid a similar fate. Erasmus uses the accelerator to take Professor Rivers, though she is yet to be fully absorbed by the manor.

Lord Marchwood slays a creature that came to the manor during one of Erasmus' unsuccessful experiments. Aided by Lord Marchwood's sword as a conductor, Sarah Jane comes up with a plan to stop Erasmus by turning him into electricity. Erasmus is destroyed and Professor Rivers is returned. Sarah Jane destroys Erasmus' machine with the sonic lipstick. While Erasmus' victims were assumed destroyed as well, Lord Marchwood and his children appear in the window of the manor.

Continuity
 Tommy Knight was not available for filming of this episode due to his GCSE exams. This story is therefore the first not to feature Luke Smith. As a result of this absence, Elisabeth Sladen is the only cast member to have appeared in every episode of the series. Other series mainstays such as Mr Smith, K9, Sarah Jane's attic and Rani's parents, Haresh and Gita, do not appear in this story.

Novelisation

Pearson Education published a simplified novelisation of this episode by Trevor Baxendale under the title The Haunted House for school literacy programs in September 2010.

References

External links

The Sarah Jane Adventures episodes
2009 British television episodes